A Postcard from California is the debut solo studio album by American musician and co-founder of the Beach Boys, Al Jardine. For the album, Jardine recruited several music icons including his former Beach Boys bandmates. The album also contains several unreleased Beach Boys songs, including "Don't Fight the Sea" and "Lookin' Down the Coast".

Jardine added "Waves of Love" as one of the bonus tracks on his 2012 reissue of the album. Intentionally or not, the digital and CD versions of the 2012 reissue contained entirely different versions of the song. The CD included a more laid-back, live soundcheck-sounding version, with Carl Wilson's lead buried among other voices, while the digital version contained a much more "produced" and punchy version in a different key and with Carl's lead brought to the fore. There is a third version of "Waves of Love" on the Japanese version. As of August 2022, the album is again available on digital streaming services, after having been unavailable for some time.

Track listing

Personnel

Musicians
 Al Jardine – lead vocals, guitars (tracks 1, 3, 7, 9, 12, 14), backing vocals (tracks 2, 4, 7, 9, 10), keyboards (track 4), banjo (tracks 6, 7), bass (tracks 6, 9, 15), piano (track 7), handclaps (track 8), 12-string guitar (track 15), harmonica (track 15)

Additional Musicians

Technical
 Scott Slaughter & Barry Phillips – string arrangements (track 13)
 Damien Rasmussen, Jeff Peters, Richard Bryant, Stevie Heger – engineers
 Jeff Peters – mixing
 Alan De Moss, Beau Floch, Chris Constable, Nels Jensen – mixing assistants
 Joe Gastwirt – mastering
 Drew Jardine, Lee Dempsey, Mary Ann Jardine, Rachael Short, Robbie Jardine, Tim Brown, Trisha Campo – photography
 Al Jardine – sleeve notes
 Kenta Hagiwara – liner notes
 Mark London – art direction, package design
 Alan Arellano – additional cover art

References

External links
Allmusic.com

2010 debut albums
Al Jardine albums
Fontana Records albums